Prehn is a surname. Notable people with the surname include:

Anette Prehn (born 1975), Danish author and sociologist
Fred Prehn (1860-1932), American harnessmaker and merchant
Kelly England Prehn (born 1980), British model, editor, influencer, fashion ambassador, and businesswoman
Paul Prehn (1892–1973), American wrestler
Rasmus Prehn (born 1973), Danish politician
Thomas Prehn (born 1961), American cyclist